The Walt Mason House in Emporia, Kansas, located at 606 W. 12th Ave., was built in 1912.  It was listed on the National Register of Historic Places in 1992.

It is an American Foursquare-style house.  It was home of Walt Mason (1862-1939), a humorist poet.  The house was deemed notable for "its historical association with Walt Mason and ...for its architectural significance as an American Foursquare style house."

References

External links

Houses on the National Register of Historic Places in Kansas
Late 19th and Early 20th Century American Movements architecture
Houses completed in 1912
Lyon County, Kansas
American Foursquare architecture